Stein Urheim (born 4 March 1979 in Bergen, Norway) is a Norwegian jazz musician (guitar) and composer, known from cooperations with Gabriel Fliflet and Mari Kvien Brunvoll.

Career
The Bergen-based guitarist Stein Urheim's name has appeared in an increasing number of contexts in recent years. In 2009 he released his debut album Three Sets of Music and the following year he received the Vossajazz festival-Award.

He has toured and released 3 critically acclaimed duo albums with singer Mari Kvien Brunvoll, Daydream Community (2011), Daydream Twin (2013) and For Individuals Facing The Terror Of Cosmic Loneliness (2015), on the Jazzland label. The duo met and started working together around 2006 at the Grieg Music Academy in Bergen, where they both studied. He was a member of Gabriel Fliflet's Åresong band (2010-2011), and participated on The Last Hurrah's debut album (2011) on Rune Grammofon. He has also written for, arranged and played on several albums by Steady Steele (2002-2006), and worked with numerous other bands and music projects, including Tom Sawyer & The Huckleberry Finns (2004-2007), Bearfarm (2006–2012), Thea Hjelmeland's Solar Plexus (2014) and Erlend Apneseth's Nattsongar (2017).

He has released 6 albums for the Hubro music label under his own name:

Kosmolodi (2012), Stein Urheim (2014),  Strandebarm (2016), Utopian Tales (2017), Simple Pieces & Paper Cut-Outs (2019) and Downhill Uplift (2020).

Honors 
2010: Vossajazz Award

Discography

Albums
2009: Three sets of music (Soundlet)
2011: Stein & Mari's Daydream Community (Jazzland), with Mari Kvien Brunvoll
2012: Kosmolodi (Hubro)
 2013: Daydream Twin — Stein Urheim & Mari Kvien Brunvoll (Jazzland Recordings)[4]
 2014: Stein Urheim - Self titled (Hubro)[5]
2015: For Individuals Facing the Terror of Cosmic Loneliness (Jazzland), with Mari Kvien Brunvoll
2016: Strandebarm (Hubro)
2017: Utopian Tales (Hubro)
2019: Simple Pieces & Paper Cut-Outs (Hubro)
2020: Downhill Uplift (Hubro)

Compilations
2012: Valgets kavaler (sueTunes Records), with various artists

References

External links 

 http://hubromusic.com/stein-urheim-stein-urheim/
 http://hubromusic.com/stein-urheim-strandebarm/
 http://hubromusic.com/stein-urheim-utopian-tales/
 http://www.jazzlandrec.com/shop.php?iid=108&category=Jazzland&action=item&title=for-individuals-facing-the-terror-of-cosmic-loneliness 
 http://www.jazzlandrec.com/shop.php?iid=86&category=Jazzland&action=item&title=daydream-twin 
 http://www.jazzlandrec.com/shop.php?iid=78&category=Jazzland&action=item&title=stein--maris-daydream-community-ep 
 http://steinurheim.com/more-music/at-the-festival/
 http://steinurheim.com/more-music/steady-steele/

Norwegian jazz guitarists
Hubro Music artists
Grieg Academy alumni
Musicians from Bergen
1979 births
Living people
21st-century Norwegian guitarists
Jazzland Recordings (1997) artists